The Women's team sprint at the FIS Nordic World Ski Championships 2011 was held on 2 March 2011. Sprint qualifying at 12:00 CET with finals at 14:15 CET. The defending world champions were Finland's Virpi Kuitunen and Aino-Kaisa Saarinen while the defending Olympic champions were Germany's Evi Sachenbacher-Stehle and Claudia Nystad. Kuitunen retired after the 2009-10 season.

Results

Semifinals

Semifinal 1

Semifinal 2

Final

References

FIS Nordic World Ski Championships 2011
2011 in Norwegian women's sport